The History of the Patriarchs of Alexandria is a major historical work of the Coptic Orthodox Church of Alexandria. It is written in Arabic, but draws extensively on Greek and Coptic sources.

The compilation was based on earlier biographical sources. It was begun by Severus Ibn al-Muqaffaʿ, although one scholar contests its attribution to him. It was continued by others including Michael, bishop of Tinnis (11th century, writing in Coptic, covering 880 to 1046), Mawhub ibn Mansur ibn Mufarrig, deacon of Alexandria, and Pope Mark III of Alexandria (for 1131 to 1167).

Description

The first half of the Arabic text known as the Ta'rikh Batarikat al-Kanisah al-Misriyah (transliterated Arabic) was edited and translated into English by Basil Thomas Alfred Evetts under the title History of the Patriarchs of the Coptic Church of Alexandria. The remainder was published by O.H.E.Burmester with English translation.  This work presents a compilation  of the history of the Patriarchs of the Coptic Church of Alexandria.

The earlier portions of the text are derived mainly from Eusebius and Coptic tradition. But from the 6th century onwards, the biographies grow longer and often seem to derive from documents written by eyewitnesses of the events recorded. The Muslim conquest of Egypt is recorded, and a vivid eyewitness account included of the overthrow of the last Umayyad Caliph, Marwan II.

Severus also relates the famous miracle of moving the Mokattam Mountain during the ruling of the Fatimid Caliph Al-Muizz around 975 (as an eyewitness of that period). The complete text has since then been expanded with appendices and continuations running up to 1894. Indeed, one unpublished manuscript continues the text until 1923.

Evetts stopped with the 52nd Patriarch, Joseph, who died in 849.  Subsequent material was published and translated by various scholars led by O. H. E. Burmester, in Cairo.

Translations
In 1713 Eusèbe Renaudot published the Latin translation Historia patriarcharum alexandrinorum jacobitarum. A scholarly Arabic edition was started by Christian Friedrich Seybold (1904).

See also
Coptic history
Coptic Orthodox Church

Notes

References
The History of the Patriarchs of the Coptic Orthodox Church to 849 AD
 Johannes Den Heijer (1989), Mawhub ibn Manṣǖr ibn Mufarrig et l'historiographie copto-arabe

Further reading

Editions and translations
 
 
 
  Parts are available online (see below).

External links
 Evetts' translation online:  at the Tertullian Project:
 Preface to the online edition
 Translator's Introduction
 Part 1 -- St. Mark to Theonas (AD 300)
 Part 2 -- Peter I to Benjamin I (661)
 Part 3 -- Agathon to Michael I (766)
 Part 4 -- Mennas I to Joseph (849)
Continuation online:
 Part 5 -- Khael II - Shenouti I (880)
 Part 6 -- Khael III - Shenouti II (1066)
 Part 7 -- Christodoulous - Michael IV (1102)
 Part 8 -- Macarius II - John V (1167)
 Part 9 -- Mark III - John VI (1216)
 Part 10 -- Cyril III - Cyril V (1894)
 Part 11 -- Cyril Ibn Laklak, part 1
 Part 12 -- Cyril Ibn Laklak, part 2
Preface

Coptic Orthodox Church
Patriarchs of Alexandria
Coptic history
History of Oriental Orthodoxy
Fatimid literature
Christian texts of the medieval Islamic world